Abu Bakr Ibn Abi Zaid as-Slawi was the pasha, or qaid, of Casablanca, Morocco and the representative of the Makhzen in the city at the time of the French bombardment and invasion of the city August 5-7, 1907.

Biography 
He was originally from Salé, Morocco. He was captured and detained aboard a French ship. French authorities transferred him to Algiers, which was under French control at the time. Muhammad Torres negotiated with the French authorities for his release.

He returned to Salé and lived as a Sufi mystic at a shrine there until his death. He was interred in Salé.

References 

Year of birth missing
Year of death missing
1900s in Morocco
All stub articles
History of Casablanca
Moroccan politicians
Society of the Ottoman Empire
Pashas
People from Salé
Political office-holders in Morocco
Sufi mystics